The Price of Silence is a 1917 American silent drama film directed by Frank Lloyd and starring William Farnum, Frank Clark and Vivian Rich.

Cast
 William Farnum as Senator Frank Deering 
 Frank Clark as Judge Vernon 
 Vivian Rich as Grace Vernon - the Judge's Daughter 
 Brooklyn Keller as Dr. Kendle 
 Charles Clary as Henry McCarthy 
 Ray Hanford as Joe Dugan 
 Gordon Griffith as Jimmie, Dugan's Son

See also
1937 Fox vault fire

References

Bibliography
 Solomon, Aubrey. The Fox Film Corporation, 1915-1935: A History and Filmography. McFarland, 2011.

External links

1917 films
1917 drama films
Silent American drama films
Films directed by Frank Lloyd
American silent feature films
1910s English-language films
Fox Film films
American black-and-white films
1910s American films